Singles and Selected was released on 7 November 2012, and is a Miss Li compilation album.

Track listing
Dancing the Whole Way Home
Bourgeois Shangri-La
Boy in the Fancy Suit
I Heard of a Girl
I Can't Get You off My Mind
I'm Sorry He's Mine
Ba ba ba
My Man
Stupid Girl
Oh Boy
Backstabber lady
Forever Drunk
You Could Have it (so Much Better without Me)
Gotta leave my troubles behind
Why Don't You Love Me

Charts

References

2012 compilation albums
Compilation albums by Swedish artists
Miss Li albums